Claudio Dalla Zuanna (born 7 November 1958) is an Argentine-born Italian Catholic archbishop. In 2012 he was appointed Archbishop of Beira, in Mozambique.

Dalla Zuanna was born in Buenos Aires, Argentina on 7 November 1958 to Italian parents. When he was a child his family moved back to their town of origin (San Nazario, in the province of Vicenza and Roman Catholic Diocese of Padua). After scuole medie he attended the educatational institutions of the Priests of the Sacred Heart and became a member of their congregation.

Ordained as a priest in 1984, he travelled to Mozambique the next year as a missionary and remained there until 2003. While there he held several important offices in the church; from 2009 he was vicar general.

On 7 October 2012 he returned to Mozambique after being named Archbishop of Beira.  His consecration took place in the basketball stadium of the railway club of Beira and was carried out by the president of the episcopal conference of Mozambique, Lúcio Andrice Muandula. On 29 June 2013, Pope Francis granted him the pallium during a ceremony in St Peter's Basilica on the occasion of the festival of St Peter and Paul.

Bibliography

References

Argentine emigrants to Italy
Italian Roman Catholic archbishops
Mozambican Roman Catholic archbishops
People from Buenos Aires
1958 births
Living people
Roman Catholic archbishops of Beira